The Canadian Amateur Championship, begun in 1895, is the men's amateur golf championship of Canada. It is staged annually by Golf Canada. It was played at match play until 1968, went to stroke play beginning in 1969, and reverted to match play in 1995. It then returned to stroke play in 2008.

Founding and early years
The Royal Canadian Golf Association was founded in June 1895, at a meeting held in Ottawa by ten charter member clubs, hosted by the Ottawa Golf Club (later the Royal Ottawa Golf Club), and the new organization was granted the prefix 'Royal' in 1896. In conjunction with the meeting, the first men's amateur championship was staged, at match play, with the Governor General, Lord Aberdeen, donating a trophy, the Aberdeen Cup, to the champion. Thomas Harley of Kingston, Ontario won the first championship.

This makes the Canadian Amateur slightly older than the U.S. Amateur, which was first staged later in 1895, and hence the third oldest national amateur championship in the world, after the British Amateur Championship, which began in 1885, and the Australian Amateur in 1894.

The Aberdeen Cup was granted in perpetuity to George Lyon, after he won three straight titles from 1905 to 1907. The original cup was retained by Lyon, but was eventually lost. A new trophy was then provided, the Earl Grey Cup. Lyon would win a total of eight Canadian titles, which is still a record, and he also won the gold medal at golf in the 1904 St. Louis Olympics.

The tournament was held annually until 1914 inclusive, but then was cancelled from 1915 to 1918 because of World War I. It resumed in 1919, and then was staged annually until 1939 inclusive, being cancelled again from 1940 to 1945 because of World War II. It has been held annually since 1946.

Willingdon Cup
In 1927, the interprovincial team matches, which had begun in 1882, and held 27 times until 1921, between teams from Ontario and Quebec, but then dropped, were resumed with the start of the Willingdon Cup competition, playing for a cup donated by the Governor General, Lord Willingdon. The Willingdon Cup features teams of four top players from each province, and is held on the first two days of the Canadian Amateur, which are also the qualifying days for the balance of the tournament. The Willingdon Cup was also not played from 1940-45.

Rotation around country
The Canadian Amateur stayed in Ontario and Quebec until 1921, when it went to Manitoba. It went to Alberta for the first time in 1929, to British Columbia for the first time in 1932, to Atlantic Canada for the first time in 1949, and to Saskatchewan for the first time in 1950. Since then, it has rotated around the country's top courses, with the current format allowing each of the six major golf regions (Atlantic Canada, Quebec, Ontario, Manitoba and Saskatchewan, Alberta, and British Columbia) to have its turn on approximately a six-year cycle. Among Canada's ten provinces, only Newfoundland and Labrador has yet to host it.

Dominant players
The Canadian Amateur was dominated in the 1920s and 1930s by Ross Somerville, who won six titles, finished runner-up four times, and had several more near-misses. Moe Norman won back-to-back titles in 1955 and 1956. Nick Weslock waited until age 40 to win the first of his four titles in 1957. Although Gary Cowan was consistently the best Canadian amateur from the late 1950s into the mid-1970s, he managed to win only one Canadian title, in 1961, but lost in the finals four more times, as well as finishing runner-up twice in stroke play. Doug Roxburgh won his first of four crowns in 1972. Jim Nelford won two in a row from 1975–1976, then narrowly missed a third in 1977, when he lost to Rod Spittle, who won two in a row. Brent Franklin won three in a row from 1985–1987, a feat not seen since Lyon did it some eighty years earlier. Richard Scott won the Canadian title in three years out of four from 2003 to 2006. Cam Burke won two straight from 2008 to 2009.

From the late 1920s into the 1970s, the Canadian Amateur often attracted many of the top American amateurs, several of whom carried the trophy south, including Dick Chapman, Frank Stranahan, Don Cherry, Harvie Ward, Allen Miller, Dick Siderowf, and George Burns. Other leading Americans who competed but fell short include William C. Campbell, Jay Sigel, and Nathaniel Crosby. The Canadian title has also been won by South African Reg Taylor (1962), New Zealanders Stuart Jones (1967) and Gareth Paddison (2001), Mexican Rafael Alarcón (1979), and Australian Gary Simpson (1993).

To date, four players have won both the U.S. Amateur and Canadian Amateur titles: Ross Somerville, Dick Chapman, Harvie Ward, and Gary Cowan. Chapman and Ward also won The Amateur Championship of Great Britain, a title which no Canadian has yet taken.

Winners who won PGA Tour events
To date, eleven players who won the Canadian Amateur have also won events on the PGA Tour. These eleven (in chronological order of their Canadian Amateur wins) are: Fred Haas, Ken Black, Frank Stranahan, Bunky Henry, Allen Miller, George Burns (golfer), Richard Zokol, Garrett Willis, Dillard Pruitt, Nick Taylor, and Mackenzie Hughes.

Rod Spittle, Canadian Amateur champion in 1977 and 1978, later won an event on the Champions Tour, the 2010 AT&T Championship in San Antonio.

Most championships hosted
The Toronto Golf Club (1898, 1901, 1903, 1905, 1909, 1913, 1926, 1995, and 2017) and the Royal Ottawa Golf Club (1895, 1899, 1906, 1911, 1914, 1925, 1951, 1991, and 2016) have each hosted nine. Next are Royal Montreal Golf Club with seven (1897, 1900, 1902, 1904, 1908, 1912, and 1931) and Hamilton Golf and Country Club with six (1922, 1927, 1935, 1948, 1977, and 1994).

Winners

References

External links

Amateur golf tournaments in Canada
1895 establishments in Canada